Cesar Acevedo (born 5 September 1953) is a retired football player from El Salvador and currently head coach of Nuevo San Sebastian.

Career
Acevedo spent his entire playing career at FAS in the primera division scoring 47 goals. He was part of the FAS squad that won the 1979 CONCACAF Champions' Cup.

He played for the El Salvador national football team, appearing in the 1978 FIFA World Cup qualifying rounds against Panama on 2 May 1976.

After he retired from playing, Acevedo began coaching football. He has managed the El Salvador youth national teams and club sides including Once Lobos.

Personal
He is the younger brother of salvadorian world cup player Elmer Angel Acevedo.

References

External links

  - Ceroacero 

1953 births
Living people
People from Santa Ana Department
Association football defenders
Salvadoran footballers
El Salvador international footballers
C.D. FAS footballers